DeepSpeed is an open source deep learning optimization library for PyTorch. The library is designed to reduce computing power and memory use and to train large distributed models with better parallelism on existing computer hardware. DeepSpeed is optimized for low latency, high throughput training. It includes the Zero Redundancy Optimizer (ZeRO) for training models with 1 trillion or more parameters. Features include mixed precision training, single-GPU, multi-GPU, and multi-node training as well as custom model parallelism. The DeepSpeed source code is licensed under MIT License and available on GitHub. 

The team claimed to achieve up to a 6.2x throughput improvement, 2.8x faster convergence, and 4.6x less communication.

See also

Comparison of deep learning software
Deep learning
Machine learning
TensorFlow

References

Further reading

External links
 AI at Scale - Microsoft Research
 GitHub - microsoft/DeepSpeed
 ZeRO & DeepSpeed: New system optimizations enable training models with over 100 billion parameters - Microsoft Research

C++ libraries
Python (programming language) libraries
Free and open-source software
Microsoft development tools
Microsoft free software
Microsoft Research
Software using the MIT license
2020 software
Deep learning software